The Spaniels were an American R&B and doo-wop group, best known for the hit "Goodnite, Sweetheart, Goodnite".

They have been called the first successful Midwestern R&B group.  Some historians of vocal groups consider Pookie Hudson to be the first frontman of a vocal group because the Spaniels pioneered the technique of having the main singer solo at his microphone while the rest of the group shared a second microphone.

Original members
The original members included:
Thornton James "Pookie" Hudson (June 11, 1934 – January 16, 2007)
Ernest Warren (December 2, 1933 – May 7, 2012)
Willie C. Jackson (April 22, 1935 - February 18, 2015; aged 79)
Opal Courtney Jr. (November 22, 1936 – September 18, 2008)
Gerald Gregory (June 10, 1934 - February 12, 1999)

Career
The group debuted in late 1952 at Roosevelt High School in Gary, Indiana as Pookie Hudson & The Hudsonaires. They changed their name to The Spaniels, and in April 1953, became one of the first artists to sign with Vee-Jay Records. The group recorded "Baby It's You", their initial release, on May 5, 1953. Released in July, the song reached No. 10 on Billboard'''s R&B record chart on September 5, 1953.

In Spring 1954, "Goodnight Sweetheart, Goodnight" hit No. 24 on Varietys pop chart, and rose to No. 5 on Billboards R&B chart. The Spaniels played regularly at the Apollo, The Regal, and other large theaters on the Chitlin circuit. Sometimes bass singer Gerald Gregory helped other doo-wop groups.

The line-up changed numerous times over the ensuing years.

The Spaniels were the top-selling vocal group for Vee-Jay. The band broke up when the label went bankrupt in 1966, but in 1969, the group reformed, releasing song like "Fairy Tales" in 1970. An entire new generation was exposed to the group's music when "Goodnight Sweetheart, Goodnight" was featured prominently in American Graffiti and Three Men and a Baby.Two Spaniels groups later performed simultaneously: one in Washington, D.C. and the original group still based in Gary. The D.C. based group, with Pookie Hudson and Joe Herndon, appeared on the PBS special Doo Wop 50''.

Bass singer Gerald Gregory died in 1999.

Hudson died in Capitol Heights, Maryland on January 16, 2007 after a lengthy battle with cancer at the age of 72.

Courtney died on September 18, 2008 at the age of 71, after suffering a heart attack.

Ernest Warren died on May 7, 2012 in Gary, Indiana at the age of 78.

Willie C. Jackson died of a rare lung disease on February 18, 2015 at the age of 79.

References

External links
Marv Goldberg's Article on The Spaniels
The Spaniels at the Vocal Group Hall of Fame
The Spaniels via soul-patrol.com
Answers.com entry
A Cappella News
Oldies.com article on The Spaniels
[ Allmusic]
Interview with member Don Porter at UC Santa Barbara - February 2000 via archival edition of website Njs4ever

Doo-wop groups
African-American musical groups
Jamie Records artists
Vee-Jay Records artists
Musical groups from Indiana